Lowell C. Hansen II (born October 11, 1939) is an American politician from South Dakota. He is a member of the Republican Party.

Hansen who is from Sioux Falls, served as a member of the South Dakota House of Representatives from 1973 to 1978, serving as Speaker of the House of that body from 1977 to 1978. He was elected  as the 33rd Lieutenant Governor of South Dakota in 1978 and re-elected in 1982 as the running mate of Bill Janklow and served from 1979 until 1987.

External links
Lowell Hansen's historical listing

1939 births
Living people
Lieutenant Governors of South Dakota
Politicians from Sioux Falls, South Dakota
Speakers of the South Dakota House of Representatives
Republican Party members of the South Dakota House of Representatives